Summit is an Amtrak and Metra train station in Summit, Illinois. It is served by Amtrak Illinois' Lincoln Service, which operates daily, and Metra's Heritage Corridor commuter line, which operates only during morning and evening rush hours in peak direction. Amtrak's Texas Eagle trains also use these tracks but do not stop. In Metra's zone-based fare system, Summit is in zone C. Summit is also the closest Metra (and Amtrak) station to Midway Airport.

Summit is the only Metra station that is served by more Amtrak trains (four trains per direction throughout the day) than by Metra trains (three inbound morning and three outbound evening rush hour trains).  This was also a stop for the Ann Rutledge until April 2007.

The eastbound Lincoln Service only stops at Summit to discharge passengers, while the westbound train stops to discharge and receive passengers.

As of 2018, Summit is the 187th busiest of Metra's 236 non-downtown stations, with an average of 101 weekday boardings.

Bus connections
Pace
 307 Harlem

References

External links

Summit Amtrak & Metra Station (USA Rail Guide -- Train Web)
Station from Google Maps Street View

Amtrak stations in Illinois
Metra stations in Illinois
Railway stations in Cook County, Illinois